Amanda Owen (born September 1974) is an English shepherd, writer and presenter.

Biography

Owen lives and farms on a remote farm, Ravenseat Farm, in Swaledale in the Yorkshire Dales with her husband Clive Owen and their nine children: Raven, Reuben, Miles, Edith, Violet, Sidney, Annas, Clementine and Nancy.

Owen first gained attention through her Twitter feed as "The Yorkshire Shepherdess", and has subsequently written five books: 
 The Yorkshire Shepherdess
A Year in the Life of the Yorkshire Shepherdess 
 Adventures of the Yorkshire Shepherdess 
Tales From the Farm
Celebrating The Seasons (28 October 2021)

In August 2017 she appeared on BBC Radio 4's The Museum of Curiosity. Her hypothetical donation to this imaginary museum was a shepherd's whistle, used to communicate with her sheep dogs. On 14 July 2019 she was the subject of Radio 4's On Your Farm. On 21 October 2019, she appeared on the podcast Trees A Crowd with David Oakes.  On 10 July 2021 she appeared as the featured guest on Radio 4's The Poet Laureate Has Gone To His Shed with Simon Armitage.

Television work
Owen and her family first appeared as regulars on Adrian Edmondson's 2011 ITV documentary series The Dales (repeated on Together TV in 2021),  alongside the Reverend Ann Chapman, the vicar of four small churches, and a number of other people living in the Yorkshire Dales. At that point, the Owen family consisted of Amanda, Clive and their five young children.

In November 2015, the family appeared in an episode of New Lives In The Wild UK with Ben Fogle, a Channel 5 programme which is made by Warner Brothers' Renegade Pictures. Their appearance led to their own observational documentary series following life on the Owens' farm on Channel 5 called Our Yorkshire Farm, which has become one of the channel's most popular programmes with over three million viewers watching each episode. On 16 February 2021, Channel 5 broadcast the first episode of series 14 of Ben Fogle: Return to the Wild, which saw Fogle back at Ravenseat Farm after six years, where he met their youngest child Nancy (who was born since his last visit) for the first time.

In November 2021, Owen was one of the four walkers travelling with the BBC's 360 degree camera, in series two of BBC Four's Winter Walks. with Owen's episode featuring a walk through Wensleydale and Raydale.

Owen also filmed a couple of reports for Live: Winter on the Farm broadcast on Channel 5 between 6–9 December 2021. Reuben Owen also filmed a feature for this series and appeared on the last episode of the series, joining The Yorkshire Vet's Shona Searson  and Manchester chocolatier Sarah Gallacher at Cannon Hall Farm with Rob and Dave Nicholson.

In 2022, Leeds-based Wise Owl Films hired Owen to present a new farming series which would join farm-based programmes like Matt Baker: Our Farm in the Dales in More4's schedules.
Unlike Baker's Dales series or her Channel 5 programme, she will visit other farms in Amanda Owen’s Extraordinary Farming Lives, set to be a six-part series of 60 minute programmes.

In November 2022, Channel 5 confirmed that Our Yorkshire Farm would not be returning to the channel in its original form with a three-part spin-off programme called Beyond The Yorkshire Farm: Reuben & Clive due to be launched on the channel on 6 December 2022. This series will show the father and son duo launching a digging business venture which sees them in the Cumbrian village of Langwathby digging out a series of ponds.

Ravenseat Farm
Ravenseat Farm is a working hill farm located in Whitsun Dale at the top of Swaledale. The nearest village is Keld in North Yorkshire, and the nearest town is Kirkby Stephen in Cumbria. It is predominantly a sheep farm of 2000 acres; as of summer 2016 there were about 900 sheep and 30 cattle.

The place name was apparently not recorded before the first edition of the Ordnance Survey in 1860.  The name must have been given first to the summit on Ravenseat Moor.  Seat is a dialect word for summit.  Place names in the North of England that include the element seat or side are usually derived from Old Norse saeter, seter or setr (elevated summer pasture).

Landscape features around the farm 
Derived from Old Norse saeter (elevated summer pasture).
 Ravenseat Moor
 Robert's Seat
 Old Side Top
 Side Edge
Derived from Old Norse dalr (valley).
 Swaledale
 Birk Dale
 Whitsun Dale
Derived from Old Norse bekkr (stream or river).
 Whitsundale Beck
 Hoods Bottom Beck
Derived from Old Norse foss (waterfall).
 High Force
 Jenny Whalley's Force

Scandinavian origins 
In the year 876, the Anglo-Saxon Chronicle reported that the Viking ruler Halfdan had divided up the land of Northumbria.

See also
 The Radford family - another large family featured in a Channel 5 documentary (22 Kids and Counting)

References

1974 births
Living people
21st-century English writers
21st-century English women writers
People from Richmondshire (district)
Shepherds
British women farmers
Writers from Yorkshire
Writers about Yorkshire